"Electricland" is a song by English hard rock supergroup Bad Company. The song was released as the only single from the band's sixth studio album Rough Diamonds. It is the last single released by the band to feature their original line-up, as well as being the last to feature lead singer Paul Rodgers until 1999's "Hey Hey".

"Electricland" was a modest success, peaking at number 74 on the Billboard Hot 100. The song was a hit on American rock radio, peaking at number 2 on the then new Rock Albums & Top Tracks chart.

Reception
In an otherwise negative review of the album, AllMusic reviewer William Ruhlmann picked "Eletricland" as an AllMusic reviewer's pick. David Fricke of Rolling Stone praised Simon Kirke's drum performance, Paul Rodgers's vocals, and the song's dark mood.

Accolades
In 2016, Classic Rock Magazine ranked the song at number ten on their list of Bad Company's 10 best songs.

Track listing

Chart positions

Personnel
 Paul Rodgers – vocals, guitar, piano
 Mick Ralphs – guitar
 Boz Burrell – bass
 Simon Kirke – drums

References

Bad Company songs
1981 songs
1982 singles
Songs written by Paul Rodgers
Swan Song Records singles